Xunyang may refer to:

Xunyang, Shaanxi (旬阳市), a county-level city in Ankang, Shaanxi, China
Xunyang District (浔阳区), a district in Jiujiang, Jiangxi, China
Xunyang River (浔阳江), section of Yangtze River north of Jiujiang, Jiangxi, China